Dimensional reduction is the limit of a compactified theory where the size of the compact dimension goes to zero. In physics, a theory in D spacetime dimensions can be redefined in a lower number of dimensions d, by taking all the fields to be independent of the location in the extra D − d dimensions.

For example, consider a periodic compact dimension with period L. Let x be the coordinate along this dimension. Any field  can be described as a sum of the following terms:

with An a constant. According to quantum mechanics, such a term has momentum nh/L along x, where h is Planck's constant. Therefore, as L goes to zero, the momentum goes to infinity, and so does the energy, unless n = 0. However n = 0 gives a field which is constant with respect to x. So at this limit, and at finite energy,  will not depend on x.

This argument generalizes. The compact dimension imposes specific boundary conditions on all fields, for example periodic boundary conditions in the case of a periodic dimension, and typically Neumann or Dirichlet boundary conditions in other cases. Now suppose the size of the compact dimension is L; then the possible eigenvalues under gradient along this dimension are integer or half-integer multiples of 1/L (depending on the precise boundary conditions). In quantum mechanics this eigenvalue is the momentum of the field, and is therefore related to its energy. As L → 0 all eigenvalues except zero go to infinity, and so does the energy. Therefore, at this limit, with finite energy, zero is the only possible eigenvalue under gradient along the compact dimension, meaning that nothing depends on this dimension.

Dimensional reduction also refers to a specific cancellation of divergences in Feynman diagrams. It was put forward by Amnon Aharony, Yoseph Imry, and Shang-keng Ma  who proved in 1976 that "to all orders in perturbation expansion, the critical exponents in a d-dimensional (4 < d < 6) system with short-range exchange and a random quenched field are the same as those of a (d–2)-dimensional pure system." Their arguments indicated that the "Feynman diagrams which give the leading singular behavior for the random case are identically equal, apart from combinatorial factors, to the corresponding Feynman diagrams for the pure case in two fewer dimensions." This dimensional reduction was investigated further in the context of supersymmetric theory of Langevin stochastic differential equations by Giorgio Parisi and Nicolas Sourlas  who "observed that the most infrared divergent diagrams are those with the maximum number of random source insertions, and, if the other diagrams are neglected, one is left with a diagrammatic expansion for a classical field theory in the presence of random sources... Parisi and Sourlas explained this dimensional reduction by a hidden supersymmetry."

See also
 Compactification (physics)
 Kaluza–Klein theory
 String theory#Extra dimensions
 Supergravity
 Quantum gravity
 Supersymmetric theory of stochastic dynamics

References

String theory
Quantum field theory
Supersymmetry